Sandy Heath transmitting station is a television broadcast station located between Sandy, Bedfordshire and Potton near the B1042. It is owned by Arqiva, formerly NTL Broadcast. It was built in 1965, originally broadcasting Anglia Television on VHF 405-lines, UHF with 625-line services of BBC2, BBC1, and Anglia Television being added by January 1971. It carried Channel 4 and Channel 5 from their launch days, Channel 5 at lower power than the other four services. Today it broadcasts digital television on the DTT platform as Digital Switchover took place on 13 April 2011. On 17 June 2018, as part of the 700MHz clearance, Com5 (ARQ A) moved from Ch52 to Ch36, Com7 (Arq C) moved from Ch32 to Ch55 and Com8 (Arq D) moved from Ch34 to Ch56  

It is a K group or wideband TV transmitter (horizontal polarization), though an original A group aerial will still receive four of the main six Muxes, in fact from Feb 2020 only MUX 4 (SDN) will be out of the A group. During DSO, the digital transmission power for the PSB and Commercial muxes increased from 20 kW to 180 kW and 170 kW respectively.

Sandy Heath is the main local TV transmitter for Bedfordshire, Suffolk, Cambridgeshire, Northamptonshire and north Hertfordshire as well as North West Essex, bringing the nearby area Look East and Anglia Tonight (except on HD freeview-103 where it sends Meridian). Coverage extends to parts of Buckinghamshire, Norfolk, Leicestershire, Peterborough, and South Lincolnshire.

It also broadcasts the BBC local radio station BBC Three Counties Radio and the independent radio station Heart East formerly Chiltern Radio.

Construction
It was opened on 5 July 1965 by Charles Hill, Baron Hill of Luton for the ITA (Anglia TV). By the end of 1965, it was hoped that nine ITA transmitters would be open.

From its start until late 1966, the transmitter could not broadcast schools programmes in the morning because the frequency (waveband) clashed with the Mullard Radio Astronomy Observatory in nearby Cambridgeshire. Anglia TV broadcast on channel 6 from noon to midnight, and the astronomy observatory broadcast on it during the morning.

Services listed by frequency

Analogue radio

Digital radio

Digital television

Before switchover

Analogue 625 line television
Analogue television services are no longer available. BBC Two was closed on 30 March 2011 and the remaining services on 13 April 2011.

References

External links
 Info and pictures of Sandy transmitter including historical power/frequency changes and present co-receivable transmitters
 MB21 Transmission Gallery – Sandy Heath
 Sandy Heath Transmitter at thebigtower.com

Transmitter sites in England
Buildings and structures in Bedfordshire
Mass media in Bedfordshire
Sandy, Bedfordshire